Pavel Krupko (born 24 April 1967) is a Soviet rower. He competed in the men's quadruple sculls event at the 1988 Summer Olympics.

References

1967 births
Living people
Moldovan male rowers
Soviet male rowers
Olympic rowers of the Soviet Union
Rowers at the 1988 Summer Olympics
People from Tiraspol